Balkwill is a surname. Notable people with the surname include:

Alexander Balkwill (1877–1947), Scottish footballer
Andrew Balkwill (born 1972), Australian footballer
Bryan Balkwill (1922–2007), English conductor
Fran Balkwill (born 1952), English scientist
Kelsey Balkwill (born 1992), Canadian athlete